Door County is the easternmost county in the U.S. state of Wisconsin. As of the 2020 census, the population was 30,066. Its county seat is Sturgeon Bay. It is named after the strait between the Door Peninsula and Washington Island. The dangerous passage, known as Death's Door, contains shipwrecks and was known to Native Americans and early French explorers. The county was created in 1851 and organized in 1861. Nicknamed the “Cape Cod of the Midwest,” Door County is a popular Upper Midwest vacation destination. It is also home to a small Walloon population.

History

Native Americans and French

Porte des Morts legend
Door County's name came from Porte des Morts ("Death's Door"), the passage between the tip of Door Peninsula and Washington Island. The name "Death's Door" came from Native American tales, heard by early French explorers and published in greatly embellished form by Hjalmar Holand, which described a failed raid by the Ho-Chunk (Winnebago) tribe to capture Washington Island from the rival Pottawatomi tribe in the early 1600s. It has become associated with shipwrecks within the passage.

Settlement and development

19th–20th century settlement

The 19th and 20th centuries saw the immigration and settlement of pioneers, mariners, fishermen, loggers, and farmers. The first white settler was Increase Claflin. In 1834, a federal  quarry operation at the mouth of Sturgeon Bay shipped its first stone blocks; they were used for a harbor breakwater in Michigan City, Indiana. In 1851, Door County was separated from what had been Brown County. In 1853, Moravians founded Ephraim after Nils Otto Tank resisted attempts at land ownership reform at the old religious colony near Green Bay. An African-American community and congregation worshiping at West Harbor on Washington Island was described in 1854. Also in 1854 the first post office in the county opened, on Washington Island. In 1855, four Irishmen were accidentally left behind by their steamboat, leading to the settlement of what is now Forestville. In the 19th century, a fairly large-scale immigration of Belgian Walloons populated a small region in the southern portion of the county, including the area designated as the Namur Historic District. They built small roadside votive chapels, some still in use today, and brought other traditions over from Europe such as the Kermiss harvest festival.

Shortly after the 1831 Treaty of Washington, the federal government surveyed what is now Door County to determine the value of the timber and to divide up parcels for eventual sale. Following the treaty, land in what is now the county was sold or granted to private citizens. From 1841 to 1932, 1,661 land patents were issued to private citizens. Of these, 774 were bounty-land warrants to veterans authorized by the Scrip Warrant Acts of 1842, 1850, 1852, and 1855. The other patents concerned the sale of land: 711 patents were filed under the Land Act of 1820, 139 patents were filed under the Homestead Act of 1862, and 37 patents were filed under the Morrill Act of 1862.

At the time the Homestead Act of 1862 was passed, most of the county's nearly 2,000 farmers were squatters earning most of their revenue from lumber and wood products. The most common product was cordwood; a cord of maple sold for 37 and a half cents. The remaining portion of the population consisted of about 1,000 fishermen and their families. The fishing industry centered on Washington Island, which at 632 persons was the most populated area at the time. Sturgeon Bay had a population of 230 people. Fishermen caught lake trout and whitefish, which were sold for two cents per pound. Out of the total population of 2,948 people, 170 fought in the Civil War. Most enlisted in 1861 or 1862. The entire assessed valuation of the county that year was $395,000, with an average of $8.00 in tax assessed to each family. It was difficult to earn enough money to pay taxes, which were often delinquent. There were 25 school districts, but staffing was a challenge due to delinquent taxes.

When the 1871 Peshtigo fire burned the town of Williamsonville, fifty-nine people were killed. The area of this disaster is now Tornado Memorial County Park, named for a fire whirl which occurred there. Altogether, 128 people in the county perished in the Peshtigo fire. Following the fire, some residents decided to use brick instead of wood.

In 1883, Harry Dankoler at the Door County Advocate set a world typesetting record.

In 1885 or 1886, what is now the Coast Guard Station was established at Sturgeon Bay. The small, seasonally open station on Washington Island was established in 1902.

As the period of settlement continued, Native Americans lived in Door County as a minority. The 1890 census reported 22 Indians living in Door County. They were self-supporting, subject to taxation, and did not receive rations. By the 1910 census their numbers had declined to nine.

In 1894 the Ahnapee and Western Railway was extended to Sturgeon Bay, with the first train arriving on August 9. In 1969, a train ran north of Algoma into the county for the last time, although trains continued to operate farther south until 1986.

Early tourism
From 1865 through 1870, three resort hotels were constructed in and near Sturgeon Bay along with another one in Fish Creek. One resort established in 1870 charged $7.50 per week (around $160 in 2021 dollars). Although the price included three daily meals, extra was charged for renting horses, which were also available with buggies and buggy-drivers. Besides staying in hotels, tourists also boarded in private homes. Tourists could visit the northern part of the county by Great Lakes passenger steamer, sometimes as part of a lake cruise featuring music and entertainment. Reaching the peninsula from Chicago took three days. The air surrounding the agricultural communities was relatively free of ragweed pollen because grain crops matured slowly in the cool climate and were harvested late in the year. This prevented late-season ragweed infestations in the stubble, which was especially attractive to those with hay fever in the city.

Even after the Ahnapee and Western extended service to Sturgeon Bay in 1894, many tourists continued taking the railroad to Menominee, Michigan to embark on steamships bound for communities in Door County. This route over Green Bay bypassed poor road conditions in the northern part of the county, which persisted until the early 1920s. Only after crushed stone highways were built did motor and horse-drawn coaches become popular for transportation between Sturgeon Bay and the northern part of the peninsula. By 1909 at least 1,000 tourists visited per year, a figure which grew to about 125,000 in 1920, 1 million in 1969, 1.25 million in 1978, and 1.9 million in 1995. In 1938 Jens Jensen cautioned about negative cultural impacts of tourism. He wrote, "Door County is slowly being ruined by the stupid money crazed fools. This tourist business is destroying the little bit of culture that was."

Orchard boosterism

In 1865, the first commercial fruit operation was established when grapes were cultivated on one of the Strawberry Islands. By 1895, a large fruit tree nursery was established and fruit horticulture was aggressively promoted. Not only farmers but even "city-bred" men were urged to consider fruit husbandry as a career. The first of multiple fruit marketing cooperatives began in 1897. In addition to corporate-run orchards, in 1910 the first corporation was established to plant and sell pre-established orchards. Although apple orchards predated cherry orchards, by 1913 it was reported that cherries had outpaced apples.

Cherry crop labor sources

Women and children were typically employed to pick fruit crops, but the available work outstripped the labor supply. By 1918, it was difficult to find enough help to pick fruit crops, so workers were brought in by the YMCA and Boy Scouts of America. Cherry picking was marketed as a good summer camp activity for teenage boys in return for room, board, and recreation activities. One orchard hired players from the Green Bay Packers as camp counselors. Additionally, members of the Oneida Nation of Wisconsin and other native tribes were employed to pick fruit crops. In addition to their pay, Native American families were given fruit that was too ripe for marketing, which they preserved and stored for long term use. A Civilian Conservation Corps camp was established at Peninsula State Park during the Great Depression. In the summer of 1945, Fish Creek was the site of a POW camp under an affiliation with a base camp at Fort Sheridan, Illinois. The German prisoners engaged in construction projects, cut wood, and picked cherries in Peninsula State Park and the surrounding area. During a brief strike, the POWs refused to work. In response the guards established a "no work, no eat" policy and they returned to work, picking 11 pails per day and eventually totaling 508,020 pails.

The Wisconsin State Employment Service established an office in Door County in 1949 to recruit Tejanos to pick cherries. Work was unpredictable, as cherry harvests were poor during certain years and workers were paid by the amount they picked. In 1951, the Wisconsin Department of Public Welfare conducted a study documenting conflict between migrant workers and tourists, who resented the presence of migrant families in public vacation areas. A list of recommendations was prepared to improve race relations. The employment of migrants continues to the present day. In 2013, there were three migrant labor camps in the county, housing a total of 57 orchard laborers and food processors along with five non-workers.

20th–21st-century events
In the fall of 1901, passenger pigeons were seen in Forestville, "in quite large flocks". This is the last reported sighting in the county. Before the forests were cleared away, myriads of passenger pigeons nested in the woods of the Door Peninsula, and during periods of migration they would frequently and effectually cloud the sun in their flight.

In 1905, the Lilly Amiot was in Ellison Bay with a load of freight, dynamite, and gasoline when it caught fire. After being cut loose, it drifted until exploding; the explosion was heard up to 15 miles away.

In 1912, the barnstormer Lincoln Beachey demonstrated his biplane during the county fair; this is believed to be the first takeoff and landing in the county.

In 1913, The Old Rugged Cross was first sung at the Friends Church in Sturgeon Bay as a duet by two traveling preachers.

In 1919, the first Army-Navy hydrogen balloon race was won by an Army team whose balloon splashed down in the Death's Door passage. Two soldiers endured  waves for an hour before their rescue by a fisherman.

In 1925, a cow in Horseshoe Bay named Aurora Homestead Badger produced  of milk, at the time a world record for dairy cattle.

In June 1938 and again in October 1952, aerial photos were taken of the entire county; in 2011 the 1938 photos were made available online.

At the time, this was the farthest distance traveled in a glider over a body of water. The trip took one hour and six minutes, with 57 minutes spent over Lake Michigan.

In 1941, the Sturgeon Bay Vocation School opened. It is now the Sturgeon Bay campus of Northeast Wisconsin Technical College.

In December 1959, the Bridgebuilder X disappeared after leaving a shipyard in Sturgeon Bay where it had been repaired. Its intended destinations were Northport and South Fox Island. Possible factors included lack of ballast and a sudden development of  waves. The body of one of the two crew members was found the following summer.

In 2004, the county began a sister cities relationship with Jingdezhen in southeastern China.

To encourage tourism, Ephraim residents passed referendums in 2016 to allow beer and wine to be sold for consumption on premises within the village and to allow beer and single, recorked bottles of opened wine to be sold off-premises. Until then, Ephraim had been the state's last dry municipality.

Geography

It is the largest county in Wisconsin by total area.

In general the shoreline is characterized by the scarp face on the west side. On the east side peat is followed by dunes and beaches of sand or gravel along the lakeshore. During years with receding lake levels, flora along the shore demonstrates plant succession. The middle of the peninsula is mostly flat with some rolling. There are three distinct aquifers and two types of springs present in the county.

The county covers the majority of the Door Peninsula. With the completion of the Sturgeon Bay Shipping Canal in 1881, the northern half of the peninsula became an artificial island. This canal is believed to have somehow "caused a wonderful increase in the quantity of fish" in nearby waters and also caused a reduction in the sturgeon population in the bay due to changes in the aquatic habitat. The 45th parallel north bisects the "island," and this is commemorated by Meridian County Park.

Features

Escarpment and dolomites

Dolomite outcroppings of the Niagara Escarpment are visible on both shores of the peninsula, but cliffs along the cuesta ridge are especially prominent on the Green Bay side, including at Bayshore Blufflands. South of Sturgeon Bay the steep side of the escarpment separates into multiple lower ridges without as many larger exposed rock faces. The face of the escarpment varies in appearance. It may consist of a bare rock face of dolomite alone, or as a face with dolomite above and shale underneath. Sometimes the rock layers are covered with glacial till.

Dolomites in the county have been separated by the different patterns marking the rocks. Each pattern is thought to represent a different general marine habitat from their formation. One layer has relatively straight and flat marks in the rocks, and is accompanied by fossils indicating a tidal flat, especially ostracods. The second layer of rocks has ripple marks and wavy patterns. Since the corals and shells in this layer are broken, the layer is inferred to have formed farther down along the reef shelf, where the corals and shells were exposed to the pounding of the waves. The third layer has rocks full of fossil burrows from marine animals. This layer formed in a still-deeper part of the middle reef under mostly calm conditions. Here, calm waters protected an abundant number of burrowing animals. Along with the fossil burrows are corals, brachiopods, and echinoderms. Yet the rocks in the third layer are interspersed with broken and disturbed material, indicating periodic storms. Each of these three layers is divided into smaller and more detailed sublayers.

The bluffs are interrupted by a series of lowlands which stretch along a northwest to southeast direction; Sturgeon Bay and the Portes de Mortes passage are two of these lowlands. Beyond the peninsula's northern tip, the partially submerged ridge forms the Potawatomi Islands, which stretch to the Garden Peninsula in the Upper Peninsula of Michigan. The largest of these is Washington Island. The islands form the Town of Washington and also the southern part of Fairbanks Township in Delta County, Michigan. The lakebed along the scarp face on the Green Bay side has a sharp bottom gradient, while in many places the lakebed of the Lake Michigan side has a more gentle bottom gradient.

Areas overlooking the scarp face are attractive locations for houses and communications towers, and the stone of the escarpment is quarried. A former stone quarry five miles northeast of Sturgeon Bay is now a county park. Many caves are found in the escarpment.

Shores
The county has  of shoreline. In 2012,  of the shoreline along Lake Michigan and Green Bay was surveyed and characterized by type.  of the shore was made of artificial materials, while the remaining  was natural.

High points

Eskers are only found in the far southwest corner of the county, but drumlins and small moraines also occur farther up the peninsula. The Door-Leelanau Ridge is an underwater moraine cutting across Lake Michigan between Door and Leelanau counties. A lacustrine terrace is located in Robert LaSalle Park.

The  Brussels Hill (elevation ) is the highest point in the county. The nearby Red Hill Woods is the largest remaining maple–beech forest in the area.

Old Baldy is the state's tallest sand dune at 93 feet above the lake level.

Pollution

The combination of shallow soils and fractured bedrock makes well water contamination more likely. At any given time, at least one-third of private wells may contain bacteria.

Mines, prior landfills, and former orchard sites are considered impaired lands and marked on an electronic county map. A different electronic map shows the locations of private wells polluted with lead, arsenic, and other contaminants down to the section level.

Most air pollution reaching the monitor in Newport State Park comes from outside the county. The stability of air over the Lake Michigan shore along with the lake breezes may increase the concentration of ozone along the shoreline. Additionally, pollution modeling predicts the presence of locally generated air pollution associated with vehicular traffic in the city of Sturgeon Bay.

Soils 

The most common USDA soil association in the northern two-thirds of the county is the Summerville-Longrie-Omena. These associated soils typically are less than three feet deep. Altogether, thirty-nine percent of the county is mapped as having less than three feet (about a meter) to the dolomite bedrock. Because there is relatively little soil over much of the peninsula and the bedrock is fractured, snowmelt quickly enters the aquifer. This causes seasonal basement flooding in some areas.

The implication of this classification is that county soils are expected to be wetter and have less microbial activity than soils in warmer areas classified as "mesic." County soils are colder than those in inland areas of Wisconsin due to the climate-moderating effects of nearby bodies of water.

Climate 

The county has a humid continental climate (classified as Dfb in Köppen) with warm summers and cold snowy winters. The moderating effects of nearby bodies of water reduce the likelihood of damaging late spring freezes. Late spring freezes are less likely to occur than in nearby areas, and when they do occur, they tend not to be as severe.

Attractions

In 1905, Theodore Roosevelt recommended that the Shivering Sands area be protected. Today this area includes Whitefish Dunes, Kellner's Fen, Shivering Sands wetland complex, and Cave Point County Park. Hjalmar Holand, an Ephraim resident, promoted Door County as a tourist destination in the first half of the 20th century. He served on a committee begun in 1927 to protect and promote historical sites, and as a result of this effort the county historical society purchased lands that are now county parks, including Tornado Park, Robert LaSalle Park, Murphy Park, Increase Claflin Park, and the Ridges Sanctuary.

Today, most tourists and summer residents come from the metropolitan areas of Milwaukee, Chicago, Madison, Green Bay, and the Twin Cities, although Illinois residents are the dominant group both in Door County and farther south along the eastern edge of Wisconsin.

Recreational lands

Lands open to public use
Door County is home to six state parks. Four are on the peninsula: Newport State Park, northeast of Ellison Bay; Peninsula State Park, east of Fish Creek; Potawatomi State Park, along Sturgeon Bay; and Whitefish Dunes State Park along Lake Michigan. Two are located on islands: Rock Island State Park and Grand Traverse Island State Park. In addition to the nature centers located inside the state parks, there are three others outside the parks. There are four State Wildlife and Fishery Areas and also State Natural Areas that allow free public access.

Besides county, town, and community parks, there is a boy scout camp, a Christian camp, and a public site operated by The Archaeological Conservancy.

Beaches

Including both the Lake Michigan and Green Bay shores, there are 54 public beaches or boat launches and 39 kayak launch sites, leading to the area's promotion as "the Cape Cod of the Midwest." 35 beaches are routinely monitored for water quality advisories.

Although Door County has fewer sunny days than most counties in Wisconsin and Illinois, it also has less rainfall and lower summer temperatures, making for an optimal beach-going climate.

Waters

Boating

In 2012, 8,341 registered boats were kept in the county. Most of the county boating accidents reported in 2012 occurred in Green Bay. A 1989–90 study of recreational boating in Wisconsin found that the county's Green Bay and Lake Michigan waters had a higher frequency of Great Lakes boating than any other county bordering Lake Michigan or Lake Superior. The typical motor used in the county's Green Bay and Lake Michigan waters had a horsepower over 90, while the typical motor used for inland county waters had a horsepower under 50. Overall, boaters perceived county waters as uncrowded and boater satisfaction was average.

An annual race is held for which participants build small plywood boats.

The county's longest river canoe route is on the Ahnapee River from County H south to the county line.

Some itineraries connecting the Great Loop around the eastern U.S. and through the Mississippi include stops in Door County.

A charity holds sailing classes each summer. 1972–1973 surveys of high school juniors and seniors in northeast Wisconsin found that students from Door County were more likely to use sailboats than students from other counties.

Lakes and ponds

Besides Lake Michigan and Green Bay, there are 26 lakes, ponds, or marshes and 37 rivers, creeks, streams, and springs in the county. The five trout streams have a combined length of  suitable for trout fishing.

Wetlands
 of wetlands cover 18% of the county's land area.  of Door Peninsula Coastal Wetlands are listed under the Ramsar Convention as wetlands of international importance. The listing includes three areas previously recognized as "Wetland Gems."

Recognized natural areas
There are 29 state-defined natural areas in the county.

Living plant collections

Living plant collections include the orchid project at The Ridges Sanctuary in Baileys Harbor and the U.S. Potato Genebank and a public garden in Sevastopol.

Animals

Vertebrate species lists
From 1971 through 1976, 11 species of small mammals were found at Toft Point, the Newport State Park Mammals Checklist has 34 species, and in 1972 44 mammals were listed for the entire county. In 1976, 8 amphibians and 7 reptiles were listed as occurring on the Grand Traverse Islands within Door County. In 1978, 8 non-rodent mammals and three squirrels were listed as occurring on the Grand Traverse Islands. From 1981 through 1995, 7 species of frogs and toads were recorded in the county. In 1992 six amphibians and eight reptiles were found in and around Potawatomi State Park. In 1981, nine species of reptiles and amphibians were listed for Chambers Island, and in the summer of 2019 six bat species were acoustically detected on the island.

Unique vertebrates
Tamias striatus doorsiensis, a subspecies of eastern chipmunk, is only found in Door, Kewaunee, Northeastern Brown, and possibly Manitowoc counties. 
In 1999, the Wisconsin Natural Heritage Inventory listed 24 aquatic and 21 terrestrial animals in Door County as "rare."

Birds
, 166 species of birds have been confirmed to live in Door County, excluding birds seen which lack the habitat to nest and must only be passing through. In 2019, 21 bald eagle and three osprey nests were found to be occupied in the county. In 2013 figures, bald eagles occupied 12 nests and ospreys occupied seven nests.

In 2008 during the spring migration, 13 species of raptors, 19 species of landbirds, and 9 species of waterfowl were seen crossing between the Door and Garden peninsulas. Reverse migration is occasionally observed in the county. When birds traveling north reach the tip of the peninsula and the islands beyond, the long stretches of water sometimes unnerves them. Instead of crossing over to the Garden Peninsula, they turn around and fly back down the peninsula.

During the 20th century, thousands of herring gulls were banded on Hat Island to determine their migratory patterns. Banded birds were found as far north as Hudson Bay and as far south as Central America.

Brood parasitism by red-breasted mergansers has been observed on Gravel and Spider islands and on another island known informally as "The Reef." They laid eggs into the nests of mallards, gadwalls, and lesser scaups.

Rare bees
The sweat bee Lasioglossum sagax was collected on Ridges Road in 2006. Aside from a single collection from Manitowoc County in 2005, it had previously been found only in Colorado.

The kleptoparasitic bee Stelis labiata is considered very rare. It was collected at Toft point in 2006. This was only the second time the species had been found in Wisconsin; the earlier collection's county of origin is unknown.

Horseshoe Bay Cave invertebrates
In 2014 an invertebrate survey of Horseshoe Bay Cave found an apparently groundwater-dwelling amphipod of the genus Crangonyx. Groundwater-dwelling Crangonyx species had never been documented in Wisconsin before. A springtail of the genus Pygmarrhopalites (a genus name synonymous with Arrhopalites) was "found on the surface of drip pools." It appeared to be adapted to cave life and the study concluded that it "could represent an undescribed cave species."

Toft Point invertebrates
In 2004, an invertebrate species list for Toft Point was published listing five isopods, four millipedes, six daddy longlegs, and 113 spiders. Of these, two of the millipedes and 14 of the spiders had never been documented in Wisconsin before.

Spiders
The climate may allow for the better survival of the northern black widow spider.

Other invertebrates
Kangaroo Lake State Natural Area has the largest breeding population of the endangered Hine's Emerald Dragonfly in the world. Motor vehicles kill an estimated 3,300 of them in the county each year. In 2019, it was reported that out of 14 Hine's Emerald Dragonflies taken from nine locations within the county, all had the same haplotype, indicating a lower degree of genetic diversity. The dragonflies had been caught in the 1990s for other research.

The Lake Huron locust lives on dunes in the county and is not found anywhere else in the state.

From 1996 to 2001, researchers identified 69 species of snails in the county, including rare species.

Research on apple maggots infesting cherries in Door County contributed to the study of sympatric speciation in the 1970s.

In the 20th century, seven fish parasites were found in Hibbards Creek and 13 in Sturgeon Bay.

During an experiment an estimated several thousand Mayflies hatched in Sawyer Harbor in 2016. They had previously been extirpated.

From April to September 2016, 43 species of insects were found to pollinate 26 species of plants near the Sturgeon Bay Ship Canal.

Bryozoans have been noticed clinging to piers.

By season

Springtime

Maple syrup production was 983 gallons in 2017 from seven operations. This was similar to figures from 2012, but down from 2007 when 15 operations produced 2,365 gallons.

The sucker run, which was a popular fishing event in the 19th century, occurs in March and April. Suckers may be taken by frame dip nets, and the sucker run is also sought out as viewing opportunity. Another permitted method of fishing for suckers is by speargun. In April 2018, the state speargun record for longnose sucker was taken by out of Door County waters on the Lake Michigan side. In April 2020, the all-methods state record for longnose sucker was caught out of Shivering Sands Creek.

Another attraction is mushroom hunting on public land. Additionally,  there are two commercial mushroom operations.

Summer

In 2017, there were ten operations growing  of strawberries.

Two of these operations grow lavender on Washington Island.

In Baileys Harbor, religious tourism includes the Blessing of the Fleet.

Door County has a history of strawberry, apple, cherry, and plum growing that dates back to the 19th century. Farmers were encouraged to grow fruit on the basis of the relatively mild climate on the peninsula. This is due to the moderating effects of the lake and bay on nearby land temperatures. U-pick orchards and fruit stands can be found along country roads when in season, and there are two cherry processors.

However, the cherry and apple businesses have declined since peaking in 1941 and 19641964 U.S Census of Agriculture, Volume 1, Part 14: Wisconsin, County Tables, Table 13: Acreage, Quantity, and Sales of Crops Harvested: 1964 and 1959 respectively due to concerns about pesticides, lack of migrant labor and a difficulty in finding local help, the closure of processing plants, unpredictable harvests, the introduction of Drosophila suzukii, land-use competition with tourism and residential development, better growing conditions to the east in the fruit belt, such as the nearby Traverse City area, and intentional destruction of a portion of the crop ordered by the processor in order to drive up prices.

Lightning bugs become common by the end of June.

Fall

In 2017, there was only  of plum orchards, spread among four operations. Research on the development of cold-hardy peaches has continued since the 1980s. In 2012, there were two acres of peach orchards, spread among seven operations.

The county was recognized as part of a larger federally designated wine grape-growing region in 2012.

In 2021, a county total of 3,940 deer were killed as a total of all deer hunting seasons, up from the total harvest of 4,166 deer in 2020. In 2020, the county had the 6th highest deer density in the state with 56 deer per square mile of habitat.

Another autumn activity is leaf peeping.

Winter
Winter attractions include ice fishing, sledding, cross-country skiing, camping, broomball, pond hockey, snowmobiling, watching lake freighters in Sturgeon Bay, and Christmas tree farms.7 Fun Places to Cut Your Own Christmas Tree in Northeast Wisconsin by November 26, 2013, BY Ashley Steinbrinck, whoonew.com In 2017, 860 Christmas trees were cut, down from 1,929 in 2012. The county has a white Christmas nearly 60% of the time.

Culture
 Lighthouses and historical sites 

Including both Lake Michigan and Green Bay shorelines, there are 50 total lights and lighthouses, besides lighted buoys. Out of these, there are 10 historically significant lighthouse structures and sets of lights still serving as navigational lights. Most of them were built during the 19th century and are listed in the National Register of Historic Places: Baileys Harbor Range Lights, Cana Island Lighthouse, Chambers Island Lighthouse, Eagle Bluff Lighthouse, Pilot Island Lighthouse, Plum Island Range Lights, Pottawatomie Lighthouse, and Sturgeon Bay Canal Lighthouse. Other functioning historic lighthouses in the county include the Sherwood Point Lighthouse and the Sturgeon Bay Canal North Pierhead Light. The Boyer Bluff Light is mounted on an 80-foot skeletal tower. In addition, the Baileys Harbor Light is a non-functioning 19th century lighthouse.

Thirteen historical sites are marked in the state maritime trail for the area in addition to nine roadside historical markers. In Sturgeon Bay, the tugboat John Purves is operated as a museum ship. Including lighthouses, the county has 72 properties and districts listed on the National Register of Historic Places. There are 214 known confirmed and unconfirmed shipwrecks listed for the county, including the SS Australasia, Christina Nilsson, Fleetwing, SS Frank O'Connor, Grape Shot, Green Bay, Hanover, Iris, SS Joys, SS Lakeland, Meridian, Ocean Wave, and Success. The SS Louisiana sank during the Great Lakes Storm of 1913. Some shipwrecks are used for wreck diving.

Buildings made from cordwood construction survive in the county, especially in the Bailey's Harbor area. Some, such as the Blacksmith Inn, are covered with clapboards on the outside. It has been speculated that the use of stovewood in the county was associated with German immigrants and was also due to the lack of manpower needed to haul heavy logs.

Food

Agritourism and culinary tourism supports food production. Cooking classes are offered to tourists.

Distinctive foods in the area include:

 cherry pie
 Belgian pie
 rhubarb pie
 cherry kuchen
 apple kuchen
 rødgrød
 rhubarb salad
 rhubarb cake
 rhubarb torte
 cherry torte
 raspberry marmalade Linzer torte
 chicken caps–broiled mushroom caps coated in chicken spread and nuts
 chocolate kraut cookies
 cooked rhubarb juice diluted with water and sweetened with sugar
 apricot pockets
 cherry tarts
 chopped cherry jam
 cherry soup
 Norwegian frugt suppe
 cherry bread pudding
 dried cherries
 limpa bread
 skorpa
 æbleskiver–Icelandic pancakesRecipe for Icelandic pancakes in The Flavor of Wisconsin: An Informal History of Food and Eating in the Badger State by Harva Hachten and Terese Allen, Madison, Wisconsin: Wisconsin Historical Society Press, Second edition, 2009, p. 192
 Norwegian and Swedish pancakes
 green tomato jam
 plum pudding with flaming brandy sauce
 baked pears with cheese
 cheese curds
 fried perch
 smoked chubs
 fish boil–fuel oil flare up originated in the county to entertain tourists
 booyah–did not originate in Europe
 Belgian trippe–sausage made with stomach lining
 lapskaus–Norwegian potato stew
 hash brown sandwich

Scandinavian heritage

Scandinavian heritage-related attractions include The Clearing Folk School, two stave churches, structures in Rock Island State Park furnished with rune-inscribed furniture, and Al Johnson's Swedish Restaurant, which features goats on its grassy roof. In Ephraim, the Village Hall, the Moravian and Lutheran churches, and the Peter Peterson House are listed in the National Register of Historic Places, as is the L. A. Larson & Co. Store building in Sturgeon Bay. Although fish boils have been attributed to Scandinavian tradition, several ethnicities present on the peninsula have traditions of boiling fish. The method common in the county is similar to that of Native Americans.

Industry
In Sturgeon Bay, industrial tourism includes tours of the Bay Shipbuilding Company, CenterPointe Yacht ServicesPublic offered rare opportunity to tour Sturgeon Bay shipyards, Staff Report, April 25, 2019, Door County Advocate and other manufacturers. In particular, Bay Ship owns a blue gantry crane that dominates the skyline. A cheese factory in Clay Banks conducts public tours.

Arts
Tourism supports an arts community, including weavers, painters, decorative artists, blacksmiths, actors, songwriters, musicians, and hymn-singers.

A quilt trail along roadside barns was organized in 2010.

The interesting landscape makes it an attractive target for photography. Several photographs have been used for commemorative stamps. A Town of Sturgeon Bay farm was featured on a stamp commemorating the Wisconsin Sesquicentennial in 2004, and a cherry orchard near Brussels was featured on 2012 Earthscapes series stamp.

Sports

Sports tourism includes an underwater hockey team, a motor racetrack in Sturgeon Bay, and a semi-pro football team in Baileys Harbor.

A county-wide men's baseball league has eight teams.

High school sports teams play in the Packerland Conference, except for girls' swimming and golf, which compete in the Bay Conference.

In 2014, Door County ranked 264th out of all 3,141 U.S. counties by number of golf courses and country clubs. The county has nine courses, tying with 42 other counties. Door County had the 87th highest number of courses per resident of all U.S. counties.

Motorcycling
In 2020, 3,545 motorcycles were registered in the county, up from 1,806 in 2008. A motorcycle club hosts a regional burning man event involving a large wooden cow and maintains the adjacent Wisconsin Motorcycle Memorial.

Flying
In 2021, 49 aircraft were registered in the county, up from 46 aircraft in 2019. During the EAA AirVenture Oshkosh, a fish boil is held as a $100 hamburger event at the Washington Island Airport to entice AirVenture conventiongoers to land on the island.

Radio stations

Economy

Door County's economy is considered a "forestry-related tourism"-based economy. In 2020, the total gross domestic product (GDP) of the county was $1.39 billion, with the $274 million manufacturing industry overtaking real estate and rental and leasing that year to become the leading industry in the county at 19.7% of the overall GDP.

Transportation
Land
According to the Wisconsin Department of Transportation (WisDOT), in 2021 Door County had  of roadways. In county figures for 2007 there were 1,455 named roads in the county.

Altogether, the county's roadways account for 1.10% of Wisconsin's 115,751 miles of public roadway. The county's roadways saw 501 million miles of vehicle travel in 2019, which was 0.43% of the 115.7 billion miles driven statewide that year. The highest volumes of traffic in the county occur on WIS 42/WIS 57 from the junction of the separated highways in Nasewaupee to the bridge over the bay. From 2014 through 2017, fatalities and serious injuries especially occurred on the western side of the peninsula between the bay of Sturgeon Bay and Egg Harbor. From 2018 through 2020, crashes involving injuries or fatalities peaked in the month of July, on Saturdays, and between 3:00 PM and 4:00 PM.

The combined WIS 42/WIS 57 separates again at a junction in Sevastapol. Following this separation, WIS 42 continues along the western side of the peninsula and sees more traffic than WIS 57, which continues along the eastern side. The two highways combine again at a junction in Liberty Grove.
  Wisconsin Highway 42 (WIS 42)
  Wisconsin Highway 57 (WIS 57)
 Door County Coastal Byway (WIS 42 and WIS 57) north of Sturgeon Bay to Northport is classified as a Wisconsin Scenic Byway and National Scenic Byway.

There are five rustic roads in the county. In addition to state-recognized rustic roads, Liberty Grove manages a heritage roads program.  there were 12 heritage roads in the town.

Non-motorized
 The Ahnapee State Trail connects Sturgeon Bay to Kewaunee, winter snowmobile access is dependent on weather and trail grooming. Although the Ice Age Trail coincides with most of the Ahnapee State Trail, the Ice Age Trail forks away in the City of Sturgeon Bay and reaches its northern terminus at Potawatomi State Park. Mountain bike trails are located in three of the state parks.
 WIS 42 and WIS 57 are part of the Lake Michigan Circle Tour.
 Egg Harbor operates a free public bicycle-sharing system, limited to daylight hours within the village during the tourist season.

Bridges across Sturgeon Bay
 Sturgeon Bay Bridge, (also called Michigan Street Bridge), truss structure, Scherzer-type, double-leaf, rolling-lift bascule with overhead counter-weights
 Oregon Street Bridge (reinforced concrete slab, rolling lift bascule girder with mechanical driven center locks)
 Bayview Bridge (monolithic concrete placed on structural deck with steel girder superstructure, open grating on deck, bascule)

Ground transportation
A daily private shuttle service operates between Green Bay–Austin Straubel International Airport and Sturgeon Bay. The nearest intercity bus stop with regular service is in Green Bay. There are multiple private and public ground transportation services within the county, but none with regularly scheduled stops for the general public.

Air
There are eleven airports in the county, including private or semi-public airports.

Washington Island Airport (2P2), small general aviation, public use
Crispy Cedars Airport, Brussels (7WI8), private, but open to visitors with advance notice
Door County Memorial Hospital Heliport, allows for air ambulance service to the hospital from remote areas of the county and for flying patients to Green Bay.
Chambers Island Airport, private
Five other small airports

Water
Ferries
 Washington Island is served by two ferry routes operating between the Door Peninsula and Detroit Harbor. One route is a 30-minute ride on a freight, automobile, and passenger ferry that departs from the Northport Pier at the northern terminus of WIS 42. This ferry makes approximately 225,000 trips per year. Another route is a 20- minute ride on a passenger-only ferry which departs from the unincorporated community of Gills Rock.
 Rock Island State Park is reachable by the passenger ferry Karfi'' from Washington Island. During winter Rock Island is potentially accessible via snowmobile and foot traffic.
 Although Chambers Island has no regularly scheduled ferry, there are boat operators which transport people to the island on call from Fish Creek.

Boat ramps and marinas
 There are 30 public boat access sites in the county. The Lake Michigan State Water Trail follows most county shorelines.

Population and its health

Demographics

2020 census
As of the census of 2020, the population was 30,066. The racial makeup of the county was 92.3% White, 0.5% Black or African American, 0.5% Native American, 0.5% Asian, 1.6% from other races, and 4.6% from two or more races. Ethnically, the population was 3.8% Hispanic or Latino of any race.

2000 Census
As of the 2000 census, there were 27,961 people, 11,828 households, and 7,995 families residing in the county. The population density was 58 people per square mile (22/km2). There were 19,587 housing units at an average density of 41 per square mile (16/km2). The racial makeup of the county was 97.84% White, 0.19% Black or African American, 0.65% Native American, 0.29% Asian, 0.01% Pacific Islander, 0.33% from other races, and 0.69% from two or more races. 0.95% of the population were Hispanic or Latino of any race. 39.4% were of German and 10.3% Belgian ancestry. A small pocket of Walloon speakers forms the only Walloon-language region outside of Wallonia and its immediate neighbors.

Out of a total of 11,828 households, 58.10% were married couples living together, 6.50% had a female householder with no husband present, and 32.40% were non-families. 28.10% of all households were made up of individuals, and 12.70% had someone living alone who was 65 years of age or older. The average household size was 2.33 and the average family size was 2.84.

For every 100 females there were 97.10 males. For every 100 females age 18 and over, there were 94.50 males. 22.10% of the population was under the age of 18, a decrease from 25.9% being under the age of 18 in the 1990 census.) Additionally, 6.10% were aged from 18 to 24, 25.40% from 25 to 44, and 27.70% from 45 to 64.

Births, deaths, and migration
In 2020, there were 192 births, giving a general fertility rate of 51.1 births per 1000 women aged 15–44, the 15th lowest rate out of 72 Wisconsin counties.

Between April 2010 and January 2021, there were an estimated 2,257 births and 3,606 deaths in the county. Although the greater number of deaths served to decrease the population by an estimated 1,349 people, this was more than offset by a net gain of 2,654 people who moved in from outside the county. Altogether, the population increased by an estimated 1,305 persons during this period. Based on 5-year ACS estimates, Door County is thought to have had a net loss of residents to other counties from 2009 to 2015 and also in 2018, but a net gain from other counties in 2016-2017 and 2019.

Most elderly and youthful communities
From ACS data from 2014 to 2018, the most elderly community in the county was the village of Ephraim with a median age of 65.4, the seventh most elderly out of all 1965 cities, towns, and villages having available data. Following Ephraim was Egg Harbor with a median age of 64.0, the 14th most elderly in the state, Sister Bay with a median age of 63.4, tied with Sherman in Iron County as the 18th most elderly, Washington Island with a median age of 62.9, tied with Union in Burnett County as the 22nd most elderly, Liberty Grove with a median age of 62.4, tied with Lakewood in Oconto County as the 26th most elderly, Egg Harbor with a median age of 59.8, tied with three other towns as the 55th most elderly, Gibraltar with a median age of 59.4, tied with the town of Raddison in Sawyer county as the 64th most elderly, and Bailey's Harbor with a median age of 58.5, tied with Big Bend in Rusk County as the 83rd most elderly.

The youngest community in Door County was the village of Forestville with a median age of 39.0. It tied with 12 other communities as the 429th youngest community in the state. Following the village of Forestville was the city of Sturgeon Bay with a median age of 42.8, tied with 9 other communities as the 742nd youngest in the state, Brussels with a median age of 46.9, tied with 8 other communities as the 1163rd youngest in the state, the town of Forestville with a median age of 47.4, tied with 9 other communities as the 1222nd youngest in the state, and Gardner with a median age of 49.4, tied with 15 other communities as the 1434th youngest in the state.

Based on ACS data from 2013 to 2017, the county had a median age of 52.4 years old, tied with Florence as the fifth most elderly of all Wisconsin counties. This was an increase from the 2000 census, which reported a county median age of 43 years. In the 2000 census, 18.70% of the county population was 65 years of age or older. By 2015, the percentage of elderly climbed, with 25.8% of the population being 65 or older, the third highest in the state.

From 2013 to 2017, 36.8% of the 9,358 households in the county included children, based on the ACS 5-year estimate, compared to 44.2% for Wisconsin in 2017, based on the ACS one-year estimate.

Religious statistics
In 2010 statistics, the largest religious group in Door County was the Catholics, with 9,325 adherents worshipping at six parishes, followed by 2,982 ELCA Lutherans with seven congregations, 2,646 WELS Lutherans with seven congregations, 872 Moravians with three congregations, 834 United Methodists with four congregations, 533 non-denominational Christians with six congregations, 503 LCMS Lutherans with two congregations, 283 LCMC Lutherans with one congregation, 270 Converge Baptists with three congregations, 213 Episcopalians with one congregation, 207 UCC Christians with one congregation, and 593 other adherents. Altogether, 69.3% of the population was counted as adherents of a religious congregation.

In 2014, Door County had the 719th-most religious organizations per resident out of all 3,141 U.S. counties, with 34 religious organizations in the county.

Marriages
Five-year ACS data from 2012 to 2016 show that an estimated 24.6% of women aged 45–54 in the county had never been married, the 69th highest percentage of never-married women in this age bracket out of 3,130 U.S. counties reporting data. The ACS estimate also found that 75.9% of women aged 35–44 were married, the 389th highest number of married women in this age bracket out of 3,136 counties reporting data. 13.4% of births were to unmarried women; the county was tied with three other counties in having the 180th lowest percentage of births to unmarried women out of 3,021 counties reporting data.

In 2017, the county had the 25th-most marriages and 44th-most divorces out of all Wisconsin counties. September had the most marriages, with 68. In 2016 the county was the 45th-most populous in the state.

Public health
In most measures of public health for 2019, the county has figures as healthy as or healthier than those of the entire state. In 2017–2018 Behavioral Risk Factor Surveillance System figures, adults in Door County have the highest incidence of arthritis, high blood pressure, cancer, high cholesterol, kidney disease, heart disease, and stroke when compared to adults in Wisconsin counties to the south along the Lake Michigan shore. Among the same counties, Door County has the second lowest incidence of asthma and the loss of all teeth, while chronic obstructive pulmonary disease and diabetes rates are the second highest. When compared to counties directly to the north in the Upper Peninsula, health outcomes in Door County tend to be about the same or better, with mixed results when comparing Door County with Wisconsin counties directly to the west across Green Bay. According to calculations based on 2010–2014 data, children born in Door County have a life expectancy of 80.9 years, the ninth highest of Wisconsin's 72 counties. From 2000 to 2010, the county's premature death rate for people under 75 fell 35.0%, the second-greatest reduction in Wisconsin.

Much of the county is thought to be far enough away from a maternity ward to cause some babies to be born outside of a maternity ward unintentionally, and the very northern part of the peninsula and Washington Island together account for one of only three populated areas in the state which are at least 30 miles away from a maternity ward.

In December 2018, Door County residents aged 18–64 were less likely to be receiving government payments for disability than the averages for Wisconsin and the United States as a whole. Five-year ACS estimates for 2012–2016 found that Door County tied with 24 other counties in having the 573rd lowest percentage of disabled residents under 65 out of all 3,145 U.S. counties. 9.3% were disabled.

According to 2015-2019 ACS estimates, 8.66% of Door County's population are veterans. 20.36% of the county's veterans have a disability, compared to 9.07% for the county as a whole. In 2019 there were 422 veterans in the county receiving compensation for a service-connected disability. 64 were aged 17–44, 84 were aged 45–64, and 274 were 65 or older. 391 were male and 31 were female. Disability ratings varied with 146 rating up to 20% disabled, 68 rating from 20%–60%, 84 rating from 70%–90% disabled, and 59 who were rated as 100% disabled.

From 2009 to 2013 the county had the highest skin cancer rate in the state.

A CDC survey of people reporting frequent mental distress (14–30 mentally unhealthy days in the last 30 days, data aggregated over 2003–2009) found that people in Door County were more likely to be distressed than those in most Wisconsin counties, but less likely to be distressed than those in the heavily urbanized southeast portion of the state. In 2018 figures for Medicare recipients, the county had the second-lowest prevalence of schizophrenia and other psychotic disorders in the state at 1.03%, although data was only available for 71 of Wisconsin's 72 counties. Nationally the county had the 87th lowest prevalence of schizophrenia and other psychotic disorders. The county also ranked 51st lowest in the state for depression at 16.13% of Medicare recipients.

With a rate of 9.53 county-medicated children per 1000 children, Door County had the fourth highest rate in the state out of all 27 counties and multi-county social services agencies reporting statistics on the psychiatric medication of minors in 2019. Out of the 51 medicated minors in 2021, 27 were female and 24 were male, 39 were white, 9 were of an unknown race, and 3 belonged to another race or was multiracial. Out of all races, 7 were ethnically Hispanic/Latino

In 2019, the county Behavioral Health Unit had 185 clients, up from 142 in 2018.

In 2017–2019 figures, 15.0% of the county's adult population smoked, the fourth lowest in the state and 275th lowest nationally.

In 2017, three people died from drug abuse, up from two in 2016.

In 2021 figures from a national health statistics program, Door County ranked 27th highest out of all counties nationally for adults either binge drinking or drinking heavy amounts of alcohol. 27.5% of adults surveyed in the county reported either binge or heavy drinking within the last thirty days, with an error margin between 26%–29%.

In 2018, Door County ranked 88th nationally for the lowest percentage of Medicare recipients who abused drugs or substances. It also had state's lowest prevalence of drug and substance abuse with 1.17% of Medicare recipients abusing drugs or substances. It also had the second lowest prevalence of alcohol abuse among Medicare recipients out of all Wisconsin counties. 1.36% of the 6,403 Medicare recipients in the county were known to abuse alcohol, which was less than the national average of 2.08%. It also ranked the lowest in the state for chronic kidney disease at 17.68% of Medicare recipients. In 2018, 3.65% of all Medicare Part D prescriptions were for opioids, less than the state average of 4.67% and the national average of 4.68%. 4,376 Medicare claims in the county were for opioids and involved 66 different prescribers. Of the 4,376 claims, 624 of them (14.26%) involved long-acting opioids, which contain more drug, have a larger potential for misuse and addiction, and are of significant concern in the opioid epidemic in the United States. Although 14.26% was less than the state average of 14.47%, it was greater than the national average of 11.79%. Both the overall Medicare Part D opioid prescription rate and the rate for long-acting opioids decreased between 2013 and 2018. In 2020, 15 deaths from opioid related overdoses were reported in the county.

The prevalence of arthritis in the county was the highest in the state at 38.03% of Medicare recipients, respectively. Nationally, Door County ranked 92nd highest for the most cancer among Medicare recipients, and it was also the top ranking county in the state with 9.98% of Medicare recipients having cancer. Out of all Wisconsin counties and for all ages, Door County had the ninth lowest age-adjusted death rate for cancer in 2015–2019 figures.

COVID-19 
On March 25, 2020, non-essential businesses were closed under the statewide Safer at Home order, with the first case in the county reported on March 30. After a ruling from the Wisconsin Supreme Court struck down the statewide order, the county board extended the quarantine until May 19, 2020. Some businesses were impacted by the coronavirus-related suspension of the J-1 visa program; no foreign students received visas to work in Door County in 2020. Meal sites for the elderly remained closed and did not reopen until June 7, 2021. Additionally, the county Adult Protective Services experienced a 70.7% drop in referrals in 2020 with only 115 new referrals submitted. This was due to elderly not leaving their homes as often and not having contact with people who typically file allegations with the Adult Protective Services. Previously the volume of allegations of self-neglect, abuse, and financial exploitation had increased from 61 referrals in 2007 to 392 referrals in 2019. Reports of child abuse and neglect decreased from 433 in 2019 to 396 in 2020; this was due to children not seeing teachers, medical professionals, or other mandated reporters. In 2021, both counts increased, with 121 APS referrals and 517 CPS reports for the year. Coronavirus statistics are updated weekly by the Door County Public Health Office, and vaccination figures are published by the Wisconsin Department of Health Services and the Centers for Disease Control and Prevention.

Crime
In 2020, there were 208 felony cases prosecuted by the county, up from 195 cases in 2019 and 171 in 2018. No trials were held concerning any of the felony cases in 2020. In 2019, 3 cases went to trial, down from 6 in 2018.

The county has been a focus of sex-trafficking enforcement efforts. From 2015 to 2020 there were no reports of sex-trafficking in the county.

In 2014, the voluntary intoxication defense in Wisconsin was repealed due to outcry following its use during a trial in Door County. Initially the trial ended with a hung jury but a retrial resulted in a conviction.

Communities

Incorporated communities

City
 Sturgeon Bay (county seat)

Villages
 Egg Harbor
 Ephraim
 Forestville
 Sister Bay

Towns

 Baileys Harbor (Cana Island is in the Town of Baileys Harbor)
 Brussels
 Clay Banks
 Egg Harbor
 Forestville
 Gardner
 Gibraltar (the Strawberry Islands, Hat, Horseshoe, and Chambers Island are in the Town of Gibraltar)
 Jacksonport
 Liberty Grove (Gravel Island, Spider Island, and the Sister Islands are in the Town of Liberty Grove)
 Nasewaupee
 Sevastopol
 Sturgeon Bay
 Union
 Washington Island

Unincorporated communities

 Brussels
 Carlsville
 Carnot
 Detroit Harbor
 Fish Creek
 Gills Rock
 Idlewild
 Institute
 Jacksonport
 Juddville
 Kolberg
 Maplewood
 Namur
 North Bay
 Northport
 Peninsula Center
 Rosiere (partially in Kewaunee County)
 Rowleys Bay
 Salona
 Shoemaker Point
 Valmy
 Vignes
 Washington
 West Jacksonport
 Whitefish Bay

 Baileys Harbor
 Ellison Bay
 Little Sturgeon

Former communities

Absorbed into Sturgeon Bay 

 Sawyer
 Stevens Hill

Sites used as parks 
 Rock Island (settlement on island), now Rock Island State Park
 Newport (community), now Newport State Park
 Williamsonville, now Tornado Memorial County Park

Adjacent counties

By land 
 Kewaunee County - south

In Green Bay 
 Brown County - southwest
 Oconto County - west
 Marinette County - northwest
 Menominee County, Michigan - northwest

Along the Rock Island Passage 
 Delta County, Michigan - north; Eastern Time Zone

In Lake Michigan 
 Leelanau County, Michigan - northeast and east; Eastern Time Zone
 Benzie County, Michigan - southeast; Eastern Time Zone

Notable people

 Robert C. Bassett (1911–2000), U.S. presidential advisor
 Jule Berndt (1924–1997), pastor
 Norbert Blei (1935–2013), writer
 Gene Brabender (1941–1996), baseball player
 Hans Christian (born 1960), musician
 Jessie Kalmbach Chase (1879–1970), painter
 Eddie Cochems (1877–1953), "Father of the Forward Pass"
 Erik Cordier (born 1986), baseball player
 Katherine Whitney Curtis (1897–1980), originator of synchronized swimming
 A. J. Dillon (born 1998), Green Bay Packers running back, has the key to the county
 Mary Maples Dunn (1931–2017), historian
 John Fetzer (1840–1900), mill owner, Wisconsin State Senator
 Jim Flanigan (born 1971), football player
 Lou Goss (born 1987), racecar driver
 Chris Greisen (born 1976), Milwaukee Iron quarterback (AFL)
 Nick Greisen (born 1979), Denver Broncos linebacker (NFL)
 Stuart Hagmann (born 1942), film and television director
 Bernard Hahn (1860–1931), Wisconsin State Representative, hotel and opera house owner, arsonist
 Arthur G. Hansen (1925–2010), engineer, university president and chancellor.
 Hjalmar Holand (1872–1963), historian
 Jens Jensen (1860–1951), landscape architect
 M. J. Jischke (born 1885), butcher, postmaster
 Al Johnson, (born 1979), football player
 Ben Johnson (born 1980), football player
 Bill Jorgenson (1930 – 2007), bluegrass musician
 Al C. Kalmbach (1910–1981), publisher
 Henry Killilea (1863–1929), helped found American League
 Curly Lambeau (1898–1965), football player and coach
 Doug Larson (1926–2017), newspaper writer
 James Larsin (b. 1855), saved seven people from drowning
 Lester Leitl (1899–1980), football player and coach
 Pat MacDonald (born 1952), once part of Timbuk 3, runs Steel Bridge Songfest
 Amy McKenzie (born 1959), producer/director
 Thomas J. Minar (born 1963), sex offender
 Edward S. Minor (1840–1924), U.S. Representative
 Alex Meunier (1897–1983), teacher, orchardist, Wisconsin State Senator
 Conrad P. Olson (1882–1952), Oregon Supreme Court justice
 Sigurd F. Olson (1899–1982), wilderness guide
 Alexander Noble (1829–1905), town official in Fish Creek
 Charles L. Peterson, (1927–2022), painter
 Casey Rabach (born 1977), Washington Redskins center (NFL)
 David M. Raup (1933–2015), paleontologist
 Hugh M. Raup (1901–1995), ecologist
 Dennis A. Reed (born 1822), Wisconsin State Representative, Civil War lieutenant
 Charles Reynolds (1839–1914), Wisconsin State Representative, Civil War captain
 Thomas Reynolds (1840–1919), Wisconsin State Representative, patriarch of Wisconsin political dynasty
 Jack Ritchie (1922–1983), writer of detective fiction
 Hallie H. Rowe (1896–1992), sheriff, Wisconsin State Assemblyman
 Paul J. Schlise (born 1966), U.S. Navy admiral
 John Shinners (born 1947), football player
 Paul Sills (1927–2008), director, improvisation teacher
 Allen Thiele (1940–2017), Coast Guard officer
 Chester Thordarson (1867–1945), inventor, erected buildings on Rock Island
 Emma Toft (1891–1982), resort owner
 Madeline Tourtelot (1915–2002), artist, founder of the Peninsula School of Art
 James Valcq (born 1963), writer of musicals
 Thorstein Veblen (1857–1929), economist
 Richard Warch (1939–2013), president of Lawrence University
 Lloyd Wasserbach (1921–1949), football player
 Charles Mitchell Whiteside (1854–1924), helped merge Sawyer and Sturgeon Bay
 Randy Wright (born 1961), Green Bay Packers quarterback (NFL)
 Albert Zahn (1894–1953), folk artist known as the birdman

Politics
From May through August 2019, a randomized study asked 313 beachgoers visiting 27 Door County beaches and 85 beachgoers visiting three beaches in Algoma, Kewaunee, and Manitowoc which political party they belonged to. Out of the total 398 people surveyed, 38.4% were Democratic, 26% Republican, 19.6% Independent, 1% Green, 1% Libertarian, 2.2% Other, and 11.8% gave no response.

The county has voted more moderately Republican than nearby Brown, Kewaunee and Manitowoc Counties ever since 1940, only voting for a Democrat in 1964 and 1996. In addition, the county voted for the winning candidate in every presidential election since 1996. President Clinton was the last candidate to win the state without carrying Door County in the 1992 presidential election. Up until the 2022 Wisconsin gubernatorial election, Door County had voted Republican since the 2010 gubernatorial election, although this did not have any significant effect on the results.

Gallery

Explanatory notes

References

Further reading

External links

 
 Door County map from the Wisconsin Department of Transportation
 Door County Historical Society
 Map of Door County articles on Wikipedia

 
Populated places established in 1851
1851 establishments in Wisconsin